Foot-and-mouth outbreak may refer to:
 1967 United Kingdom foot-and-mouth outbreak
 2001 United Kingdom foot-and-mouth outbreak
 2007 United Kingdom foot-and-mouth outbreak
 2010 Japan foot-and-mouth outbreak
 Most recent outbreak in Indonesia